Queensbury is a large village in the metropolitan borough of Bradford, West Yorkshire, England. Perched on a high vantage point above Halifax, Clayton and Thornton and overlooking Bradford itself, Queensbury is one of the highest parishes in England, with views beyond the West Yorkshire conurbation to the hills of Brontë Country and the Yorkshire Dales to the north and north west.  It had a population of 8,718 in 2001 which increased to 16,273 in the 2011 Census.

Queensbury is most famous as being the home of Black Dyke Mills, and the Black Dyke Band.

History 
Queensbury was originally known as Queenshead. That name was derived from a local pub, now a house on the High Street, which was popular with travellers on the pack horse route from Halifax to Bradford.

The village was historically divided between the township of Clayton in the parish of Bradford, and the township of Northowram in the parish of Halifax, both in the West Riding of Yorkshire.  It became a separate civil parish and urban district in 1894.  In 1937 the civil parish was abolished, and the urban district was merged into the new Queensbury and Shelf Urban District. In 1974 the urban district was split, and Queensbury was transferred to the City of Bradford in the new county of West Yorkshire.

Governance 
Queensbury Ward is a ward in Bradford Metropolitan District in the county of West Yorkshire, England, named after the village of Queensbury around which it is drawn.  It includes the villages of Clayton Heights and Horton Bank Top as well as several hamlets: Ambler Thorn, Calder Banks, Catherine Slack, Hazel Hirst, Hunger Hill, Little Moor, Mountain, Old Dolphin, Scarlet Heights, Shibden Head and West Scholes.

 indicates seat up for re-election.
 indicates councillor defection.
 indicates a by-election.

Black Dyke Mills 

Black Dyke Mills was built from 1835 onwards by John Foster as a wool spinning and weaving mill specialising in worsted and mohair fabric, and by 1851 dominated the town. John Foster & Son, the owners of  Black Dyke Mills, were responsible for the construction of many of the buildings in and around Queensbury, each being for the benefit of the employees, be it housing/accommodation, shops and leisure facilities.  In 1891 the company erected the Victoria Hall in Queensbury for the benefit of its workers and the local community - it had a concert hall, with gallery to seat 650 people, library, billiard room and many other facilities. It also sponsored the internationally famous Black Dyke Mills Band.

The mill has now been converted into individual business units. The company now manufactures elsewhere in the area.

Music 

As well as being home to the world famous Black Dyke Band, Queensbury is also noted for its strong musical heritage. Home to the world-class rehearsal studio Backfeed, notable musical residents Giles Stocks and Joe Irish of Jon Jones and the Beatnik Movement, pop-punk trio State of Error, and the bands of the Sherry family, including the nationally successful Scarlet Heights (named after the hamlet), The Bad Beat Revue and Ti Amo.

Transport 
Three railway lines once converged on Queensbury, one from Halifax, Keighley and Bradford each, known as the Queensbury Lines, all belonging to the Great Northern Railway (later the London & North Eastern Railway). Where they met was located Queensbury station, which famously consisted of continuous platforms on all three sides of a triangular junction, an uncommon layout in the United Kingdom (the only other examples were Ambergate, on the Midland Railway in Derbyshire and Earlestown in Lancashire).

All these lines were closed to passengers in May 1955, later to freight in the 1960s, before finally closing to all traffic in 1972–74.

The main Bradford to Halifax road A647 road runs through the village as well as the A644 road. These roads intersect at the Albert Memorial. First Calderdale & Huddersfield & First Bradford bus route 576, runs through the village between Bradford and Halifax along the A647 road.

Gallery

See also
 William Foster - John Foster's grandson
 Trinity Academy Bradford, a secondary school in Queensbury
 Listed buildings in Queensbury, West Yorkshire

References

External links 

 Queensbury Directory: community news and business directory
 
 John Fosters/Black Dyke Mills History
 Queensbury School
 Queensbury Juniors ARFLC

Villages in West Yorkshire
Wards of Bradford
Unparished areas in West Yorkshire
Former civil parishes in West Yorkshire
Geography of the City of Bradford